Wörgl is a city in the Austrian state of Tyrol, in the Kufstein district.

Population

Transport
Wörgl is an important railway junction between the line from Innsbruck to Munich, and the inner-Austrian line to Salzburg. Its railway station has been designated as a Hauptbahnhof since 10 December 2006.

European route E641 connects Wörgl with Salzburg, the routes E45 and E60 (Austrian autobahn A12) pass through Wörgl.

History

World War II 
Nearby Itter Castle was the site of one of the last European and most unusual battles of World War II.  The Battle for Itter Castle was fought on 5 May 1945 by surrendered Wehrmacht troops, the United States Army, Austrian Resistance fighters and former French political prisoners against the 17th Waffen-SS Panzer Grenadier Division.  The leader of the surrendered Wehrmacht troops, Major Josef Gangl, was killed during the battle and is buried in Wörgl's municipal cemetery.  A street in the city is named for Gangl.

Twin towns – sister cities
 Albrechtice nad Orlicí, Czech Republic
 Suwa, Japan

The Wörgl Experiment

Wörgl was the site of the "Miracle of Wörgl" during the Great Depression. It was started on July 31, 1932, with the issuing of "Certified Compensation Bills", a form of local currency commonly known as Stamp Scrip, or Freigeld. This was an application of the monetary theories of the economist Silvio Gesell by the town's then-mayor, .

The experiment resulted in a growth in employment and meant that local government projects such as new houses, a reservoir, a ski jump and a bridge could all be completed, seeming to defy the depression in the rest of the country. Inflation and deflation are also reputed to have been non-existent for the duration of the experiment.

Despite attracting great interest at the time, including from French Premier Edouard Daladier and the economist Irving Fisher, the "experiment" was terminated by Austria's central bank Oesterreichische Nationalbank on September 1, 1933.

In 2006, milestones were placed across the town to commemorate this event.

Notable people
Reinhard Furrer, a German scientist and astronaut, was born in Wörgl.
Gerhard Berger, a former Formula One driver and former co-owner of Scuderia Toro Rosso, was born in Wörgl.
Stefan Horngacher, an Olympic ski jumper, was born in Wörgl.
Hans Peter Haselsteiner, a building tycoon and former deputy chair of the Liberal Forum, was born in Wörgl.
Richard Kitzbichler, a former Austria national football team player and current assistant manager of Premier League side Southampton F.C., was born in Wörgl.

Gallery

See also 
Local currency
Ithaca Hours
Silvio Gesell
Freigeld

References

External links

Wörgl's attempt in the 1930s to establish a local currency
Wörgl Gigapixel Panorama (11.000 Megapixel)
Community Currency Online Magazine
Website of the Wörgl Tourist Board

 
Cities and towns in Kufstein District
Freiwirtschaft
Kufstein District